The 2019 Innisbrook Open was a professional tennis tournament played on outdoor clay courts. It was the sixth edition of the tournament which was part of the 2019 ITF Women's World Tennis Tour. It took place in Palm Harbor, Florida, United States between 1 and 7 April 2019.

Singles main-draw entrants

Seeds

 1 Rankings are as of 18 March 2019.

Other entrants
The following players received wildcards into the singles main draw:
  Pamela Montez
  Alycia Parks

The following players received entry from the qualifying draw:
  Akgul Amanmuradova
  Safiya Carrington
  Emily Fanning
  Ingrid Neel
  Anastasia Nefedova
  Laura Pigossi

The following player received entry as a lucky loser:
  Haruna Arakawa

Champions

Singles

 Barbora Krejčíková def.  Nicole Gibbs, 6–0, 6–1

Doubles

 Quinn Gleason /  Ingrid Neel def.  Akgul Amanmuradova /  Lizette Cabrera, 5–7, 7–5, [10–8]

References

External links
 2019 Innisbrook Open at ITFtennis.com
 Official website

2019 ITF Women's World Tennis Tour
2019 in American sports